Gryaznukha is a rural locality (a khutor) in Lebyazhenskoye Rural Settlement, Kamyshinsky District, Volgograd Oblast, Russia. The population was 79 as of 2010. There are 5 streets.

Geography 
Gryaznukha is located on the Volga Upland, on the Kamyshinka River, 15 km northwest of Kamyshin (the district's administrative centre) by road. Srednyaya Kamyshinka is the nearest rural locality.

References 

Rural localities in Kamyshinsky District